The Jewish Music Institute (JMI) is an arts organisation based at SOAS, the University of London's School of Oriental and African Studies. Its chair is Jennifer Jankel. It was previously known as the Jewish Music Heritage Trust and was refounded under its present name in 2000. JMI organises an annual free festival of klezmer music, Klezmer in the Park,  in Regent's Park, London.

References

External links
 Official website
2000 establishments in England
Arts organisations based in England
Heritage organisations in the United Kingdom
Jewish music
Jewish organisations based in the United Kingdom
Klezmer
SOAS University of London